Shabtaie Ice Ridge is an ice ridge between MacAyeal Ice Stream and Bindschadler Ice Stream at the junction of Shirase Coast and Siple Coast, Marie Byrd Land. Named by Advisory Committee on Antarctic Names (US-ACAN) after Sion Shabtaie, Geophysical and Polar Research Center, University of Wisconsin, Madison, WI, who, with Charles R. Bentley, 1982–84 and 1985–86, made a glaciogeophysical survey of the nearby Mercer, Whillans and Kamb Ice Streams (formerly Ice Streams A, B and C) and the intervening ice ridges.

Ridges of Marie Byrd Land